The Speaker of the Northern Ireland House of Commons was the presiding officer of the lower house of Parliament in Northern Ireland from 1921 to 1972.

The Speaker had an official residence, Stormont House.  All the Speakers were members of the Ulster Unionist Party on their election.

There was initially one Deputy Speaker, also invariably an Ulster Unionist, who was also the Chairman of Ways and Means.  In 1958 a second Deputy Speaker was appointed, and given the title Deputy Chairman of Ways and Means.  From 1963 onwards, this post was often given to members of the Nationalist Party or Northern Ireland Labour Party.

Speakers

Chairman of Ways and Means and Deputy Speaker

References
Members of the Northern Ireland House of Commons 

 
House of Commons of Northern Ireland
Norniron
Norniron
Norniron